Darnick railway station is located on the Broken Hill line in New South Wales, Australia. The platform is only long enough to facilitate one door.

History
Darnick station opened on 7 November 1927 when the Broken Hill line was extended from Condobolin to Trida.

Services
Darnick is served by NSW TrainLink's weekly Outback Xplorer between Sydney and Broken Hill. This station is a request stop, so the train only stops here if passengers have booked to board/alight here. Journey Beyond’s  weekly Indian Pacific also passes through here however it does not stop

References

External links
Darnick station details Transport for New South Wales

Railway stations in Australia opened in 1927
Regional railway stations in New South Wales